Atari 2600 homebrew is a term describing hobbyist-developed games for the Atari 2600 video game console. The first such game was written in 1995, and more than 100 have been released since then. The majority of games are unlicensed clones of games for other platforms, and many were written for the technical challenge. There are also ROM hacks and some original games. Several games have received attention outside the hobbyist community. Some have been included in a game anthology by Activision.

With severe resource limitations such as only 128 bytes of RAM and no video frame buffer, the 2600 is a difficult machine to program. Emulators, the Batari Basic language, and freely available documentation, can help the hobbyist developer. There is an active community of Atari 2600 developers—the largest among classic systems.

History 

The Atari 2600 game console was introduced to the market by Atari, Inc. in 1977 as the Atari Video Computer System or Atari VCS for short. Hundreds of games from dozens of companies have been released for the system,  with some selling millions of copies, such as Missile Command and  Pitfall!. The 2600 continued to be manufactured throughout the 1980s, long past its peak years, until Atari Corporation dropped support in January 1992.

The next year, Harry Dodgson released the first hobbyist-produced cartridge: 7800/2600 Monitor Cartridge. It is a development tool that, after attempting to get Atari interested Dodgson decided to manufacture on his own. He purchased a batch of Atari 7800 Hat Trick games at Big Lots for a dollar or less each and cannibalized the parts. He advertised the cartridge on Usenet and in a catalog for game seller Video 61, ultimately selling around 25 copies.

In 1995—three years after Atari's withdrawal of the 2600 from the marketplace—enthusiast Ed Federmeyer released SoundX, a cartridge to demonstrate the sound capabilities of the system. Federmeyer used the term homebrew to describe hobbyist-driven development, inspired by the California Homebrew Computer Club of the 1970s. After designing the cartridge for his own use, Federmeyer advertised it on Usenet,  followed by an unlicensed port of Tetris.

Since then, over 100 games have been released, many published by AtariAge.

Types of projects 

Most hobbyist-developed Atari 2600 games were created for the technical challenge, not as exercises in game design, and are unlicensed clones of arcade and computer games that were popular during the 1980s. Lady Bug, released by John W. Champeau in 2006, is an implementation of the 1981 Universal arcade game. Juno First, released by Chris Walton in 2009, borrows the name and design of the 1983 Konami arcade game; and Thrust, released by Thomas Jentzsch in 2000, is a clone of the BBC Micro game of the same name. Other programmers have implemented Sea Wolf (as Seawolf), Tetris (as Edtris 2600), and Caverns of Mars (as Conquest of Mars). The 2600 version of Star Castle was undertaken because it had previously been said that "a decent version couldn’t be done."

Several releases have expanded upon earlier games. Warring Worms, by Billy Eno (2002), takes the core design of Surround and adds new gameplay modes, such as the ability to fire shots at the opponent. Medieval Mayhem by, Darrell Spice Jr., is a version of the 1980 arcade game Warlords which includes elements omitted from Atari's official port.

While the majority of the hobbyist development community uses designs from existing games, there are also original titles. In SCSIcide, released by Joe Grand in 2001, the player acts as a hard drive read head picking up color-coded data bits as they fly past. Oystron, released by Piero Cavina in 1997, is an action game in which "space oysters" are opened and pearls collected to earn ammunition. Duck Attack! allows the player to battle giant, fire-breathing ducks in a quest to save the world from a mad scientist.

A demake is a port from a system generations past the 2600. Halo 2600 is a 4 KB game inspired by the Halo series of games. It was written by former Microsoft vice-president Ed Fries, who was involved in Microsoft's acquisition of Halo creator Bungie. Other 2600 demakes include the Portal-inspired Super 3D Portals 6 and a demo based on the Mega Man franchise.

ROM hacking modifies existing ROM images. Modifications typically include new graphics and game colors, but may also include gameplay modifications and the ability to use a different controller than the one for which the game was originally designed. One hack target is the 2600 version of Pac-Man, in which the graphic elements are reworked to more closely resemble the arcade version.

Games 

In 2003, Activision selected several homebrew 2600 games for inclusion in the Game Boy Advance version of its Activision Anthology: Climber 5 by Dennis Debro (2004), Okie Dokie by Bob Colbert (1996), Skeleton+ by Eric Ball (2003), Space Treat Deluxe by Fabrizio Zavagli (2003), Vault Assault by Brian Prescott (2001), Video Euchre by Erik Eid (2002), and Oystron. In 2005, SCSIcide, Oystron, Warring Worms, Skeleton+, and Marble Craze by Paul Slocum (2002) were listed as the "Best 2600 Homebrew Games" in the book Gaming Hacks: 100 Industrial-Strength Tips & Tools by Simon Carless.

Games that have received attention outside the hobbyist development community include Halo 2600, Duck Attack!, and A-VCS-tec Challenge by Simon Quernhorst (2006), an unofficial port of the 1981 Atari 8-bit family game Aztec Challenge.

In May 2018 it was announced that the Retron 77, a clone of the Atari 2600 console, would include four homebrew pack in-games: Astronomer, Baby, Muncher 77, and Nexion 3D.

Development 

The Atari 2600 is generally considered to be a very demanding programming environment, with a mere 128 bytes of RAM and no video frame buffer at all. The programmer must prepare each line of video output as it is being sent to the television. The only sprite capabilities are one-dimensional 1-bit and 8-bit patterns; creating a two-dimensional object requires changing the pattern between each line of video. Games are often developed using Atari 2600 emulators such as Stella and Z26.

Unlike later consoles, the 2600 will run any properly configured cartridge without checking for a digital signature or performing any other type of authentication.
It was this aspect of the system that enabled third-party companies such as Activision and Imagic to develop Atari 2600 games without Atari's consent in the 1980s. This led Atari to incorporate authentication features in its later console, the Atari 7800, to prevent other companies from creating and selling their own 7800 games without Atari's permission.

With third-party hardware such as the Cuttle Cart and Harmony Cartridge, developers could load in-progress games onto a physical Atari console to test. The Cuttle Cart, developed by Chad Schell in the early 2000s, was designed to be compatible with the Starpath Supercharger, and allows ROM images to be loaded via an 1/8" minijack audio interface such as a cassette tape or CD player.

Batari Basic 
As the 2600 uses the 6507, a variant of the MOS Technology 6502 processor, most games are written in 6502 assembly language. In 2007, developer Fred X. Quimby released the Batari Basic compiler allowing developers to write games in BASIC, a high-level programming language. Game designer and Georgia Institute of Technology associate professor Ian Bogost has used Batari Basic in his classes to teach students video game concepts and history. An integrated development environment for Microsoft Windows, Visual Batari Basic, is also available.

See also
Stella (emulator)

References

External links 
 AtariAge: Atari 2600 programming
 Batari Basic, a BASIC compiler for the Atari 2600

Homebrew
Homebrew software
Video game development